Nilssoniopteris is an extinct form genus of leaves belonging to the Bennettitales. Leaves are slender and often entire-margined (smooth-edged), though some species have dissected leaves with numerous small segments extending down to the rachis of the leaf. Nilssoniopteris-like leaves are distinguished by their syndetocheilic stomata, indicating bennettitalean affinities. Similar "taeniopterid" leaves are placed in the genus Nilssonia if their stomata are instead haplocheilic (indicating cycad affinities), or Taeniopteris if the cuticle is not preserved.

References 

Prehistoric plant genera
Bennettitales
Permian plants
Triassic plants
Jurassic plants
Cretaceous plants
Prehistoric plants of North America